Shahrabad (also Romanized as Shahrābād) is a village in Mehrabad Rural District, Bahman District, Abarkuh County, Yazd Province, Iran. At the 2006 census, its population was 245, in 87 families.

References 

Populated places in Abarkuh County